On the Mountain is a jazz album by drummer Elvin Jones with keyboardist Jan Hammer and bassist Gene Perla recorded in 1975 and originally released on Perla's PM label.

Reception

Jim Todd of Allmusic called the album "a minor, if somewhat overlooked, classic from the tail-end of the early '70s to the mid-70s' run of great jazz fusion releases".

Track listing
 "Thorn of a White Rose" (Jan Hammer) - 5:07 
 "Namuh" (Gene Perla) - 7:47 
 "On the Mountain" (Perla) - 4:37 
 "Smoke in the Sun" (Hammer) - 4:00 
 "London Air" (Hammer) - 5:29 
 "Destiny" (Perla) - 7:28

Personnel
Elvin Jones  - drums 
Jan Hammer - piano, electric piano, synthesizer
Gene Perla - bass, electric bass

References

Elvin Jones albums
1975 albums
Albums produced by Arif Mardin